Þórisvatn (sometimes anglicized to Thorisvatn) is the largest lake of Iceland, situated at the south end of Sprengisandur highland road within the highlands of Iceland.

It is a reservoir of a surface about 88 km2 and uses the energy of the river Þjórsá, which comes down from the glacier Hofsjökull. Here in the south, it is exploited in a power station. It is like other Icelandic lakes, which are mostly glacial lakes or volcanic lakes, it normally has a stark green color.

The lake grew from about 70 km² to 86 km² with the construction of the power station and was previously only the second largest lake in the country.

See also
List of lakes of Iceland
Geography of Iceland

References

External links
Photo

Highlands of Iceland
Lakes of Iceland
Rift lakes of Iceland